Cuba-Jamaica relations refers to the bilateral relations between Republic of Cuba and Jamaica. Cuba has an embassy in Kingston and Jamaica has an embassy in Havana. Both countries are members of the Community of Latin American and Caribbean States.

History

In 1972, Cuba and Jamaica established formal diplomatic relations.

In 1977, Fidel Castro visited Jamaica, marking the first time a Cuban leader had visited Jamaica. In 1997, Fidel visited Jamaica again to attend the funeral of Michael Manley.

Prime Minister Percival James Patterson visited Cuba in May 1997 and in late 1997, Jamaica upgraded its consulate in Havana into an Embassy In 2016, Jamaican Prime Minister Andrew Holness pledged to identify ways to deepen collaboration and exchanges in the areas of trade, tourism, climate change and disaster mitigation as well as culture and education. Prime Minister Holness also paid tributes to the late Fidel Castro in 2016.

Aid
Cuba has built several schools in Jamaica such as José Martí Technical High School and the G.C. Foster College of Physical Education and Sport and The Fidel Castro Campus of the Anchovy High School in Montpelier, St. James, was opened in 2015.

Cuba has also treated hundreds of Jamaicans for various eye diseases free of charge.

In 2020, Jamaican Senate president Tom Tavares-Finson praised Cuba for providing over 30,000 Jamaicans with free eye care and providing over 500 teachers to teach across Jamaica as while as providing scholarships to Jamaicans to study in Cuban universities.

See also
 Foreign relations of Cuba
 Foreign relations of Jamaica

References 

 
Bilateral relations of Cuba